Erelieva is a genus of snout moths. It was described by Carl Heinrich in 1956.

Species
Erelieva coca (Dyar, 1914)
Erelieva quantulella (Hulst, 1887)
Erelieva parvulella (Ely, 1910)

References

Phycitinae
Taxa named by Carl Heinrich
Pyralidae genera